Boyacá Chicó Fútbol Club is a professional Colombian football team based in Tunja playing in the Categoría Primera A. The club was founded on March 26, 2002 in Bogotá as Deportivo Bogotá Chicó F.C., named after one of the city's neighborhoods. After gaining promotion from Primera B in 2003 and playing one more season in the capital, the club was relocated to its current ground and renamed Boyacá Chicó F.C. They play their home games at the Estadio de La Independencia stadium.

History
The club was founded in 2002 as Chicó Futbol Club, after the neighborhood of Chicó, in the locality of Chapinero in Bogotá, where Eduardo Pimentel, the manager of the project and former player of Millonarios, América de Cali, Independiente Medellín, Deportivo Pereira and the Colombia national football team, was born. The club played their first season in Primera B in 2002 after buying a license from Cortuluá, and won the Primera B championship in 2003, beating Pumas de Casanare in the double-legged final series and earned further promotion to Primera A.

After its move to Tunja and the arrival of manager Alberto Gamero in 2006, Boyacá Chicó started enjoying consistent results which allowed them to reach the semifinals of the domestic championship in the 2006 Finalización and both tournaments of the 2007 season, qualifying for the 2008 Copa Libertadores. In 2008, the club won its first Primera A title, defeating América de Cali in the Torneo Apertura final. In 2016, after thirteen seasons in Primera A, the team was relegated. However, the club only spent one season in the second tier, being promoted back to the Primera A after winning the Primera B championship in 2017.

Honours

Domestic
 Categoría Primera A:
Winners (1): 2008–I

 Categoría Primera B:
Winners (3): 2003, 2017, 2022
Runners-up (1): 2019

 Copa Colombia:
Runners-up (1): 2011

Performance in CONMEBOL competitions
The club has appeared in the Copa Libertadores twice, reaching the preliminary round in 2008 and the group stage in the 2009 edition.

Players

Current squad

Managers
  Eduardo Pimentel (2004–05)
  Mario Vanemerak (2005)
  Alberto Gamero (July 2005 – Dec 2013)
  José Ricardo Pérez (Jan 2014 – Dec 14)
  Eduardo Lara (Dec 2014–15)
  Eduardo Pimentel (2015)
  José Ricardo Pérez (2016)
  Darío Sierra (2016)
  Nelson Gómez (2016)
  Darío Sierra (2016)
  Nelson Olveira (2016–17)
  Jhon Jaime Gómez (2017–20)
  Belmer Aguilar (2020–2021)
  Mario García (2021–)

References

External links

 Official website of Chicó F.C. (archived)

 
Football clubs in Colombia
Association football clubs established in 2002
2002 establishments in Colombia
Categoría Primera A clubs
Categoría Primera B clubs
Tunja